is a railway station in the city of Fuji, Shizuoka Prefecture, Japan, operated by the private railway operator Gakunan Railway.

Lines

Station layout
Gakunan-Enoo Station is an unmanned station with a bay platform serving two tracks. The wooden station building has no ticket machine, and is unattended.

Adjacent stations

Station history
Gakunan-Enoo Station was opened on January 20, 1953.

Passenger statistics
In fiscal 2017, the station was used by an average of 157 passengers daily (boarding passengers only).

Surrounding area
The station is located in an isolated industrial area with no stores, houses or even vending machines within close walking distance. The nearest factory is operated by UCC Ueshima Coffee Co.

See also
 List of Railway Stations in Japan

References

External links

  

Railway stations in Shizuoka Prefecture
Railway stations in Japan opened in 1953
Fuji, Shizuoka